Richard L. Moore (born 1945) is an American former professional basketball player.

A 6'4" guard, he played college basketball for one season at Villanova before becoming academically ineligible and transferring to Hiram Scott College for his final two years. During his senior season he averaged 38.8 points per game. Following his college career, he worked out several times with the Philadelphia 76ers before signing with the San Diego Rockets in May 1967. After being released by San Diego in the fall, he signed with the Denver Rockets of the American Basketball Association. He played for Denver during the 1967–68 season, where he averaged 3.8 and 1.1 rebounds points per game before being released in December 1967.

Moore has the distinction of being drafted by three different NBA teams in three consecutive years:
 1965 – 5th round (5th pick, 43rd overall) by the Philadelphia 76ers
 1966 – 10th round (1st pick, 85th overall) by the New York Knicks
 1967 – 3rd round (10th pick, 29th overall) by the San Diego Rockets

References

External links

1945 births
Living people
American men's basketball players
Basketball players from Philadelphia
Denver Rockets players
Hiram Scott College alumni
John Bartram High School alumni
New York Knicks draft picks
Philadelphia 76ers draft picks
San Diego Rockets draft picks
Shooting guards
Villanova Wildcats men's basketball players

it:Richie Moore